The Sarawak order of precedence is a nominal and symbolic hierarchy of important positions within the state of Sarawak, Malaysia. It has no legal standing but is used to dictate ceremonial protocol at events of a state nature.

Order of precedence 
Order of precedence in Sarawak is as follows:

See also 
 List of post-nominal letters (Sarawak)

References 

Orders of precedence in Malaysia
Government of Sarawak